Cividino (Siidì in bergamasque is part of the  Castelli Calepio community, in the Province of Bergamo. It has nearly 4000 inhabitants.

Municipalities of the Province of Bergamo